Glenn Stemmons Coffield (June 5, 1917 – June 16, 1981) was an American poet and conscientious objector. He was born in Prescott, Arizona, and received a B.S. degree in education from Central Missouri State Teachers College in 1940. During World War II, he served in Civilian Public Service (CPS) Camp #7 in Magnolia, Arkansas, and then was transferred to the Camp Angel CPS camp near Waldport, Oregon in 1942.
Coffield is sometimes called Oregon's first hippie.

The artist Kemper Nomland was at Camp Angel, and attempted to capture Coffield's creativity in a painting donated to the Lewis and Clark College in Portland, Oregon.
Coffield's first collection of poems Ultimatum (1943)  was a one-man operation since he was author, typist, designer and illustrator, as with most of his subsequent works.
His anthology Horned Moon was published by Everson's Untide Press in 1944. In the poem Indivisible he describes the world as more loosely strung than a nation, feeling pain more slowly "as when wild horses stampede on broken hooves".
Some of his poems were also published in the Untide Press magazine Illiterati.

After the war Coffield did some acting in San Francisco with a repertory called The Interplayers led by Kermit Sheets. From 1947–1954 he ran the Grundtvig Folk School at Eagle Creek in the Mount Hood wilderness in Oregon, where he published numerous small poetry journals and newsletters. In the 1960s Coffield moved back to San Francisco, where he was severely injured in a hit and run accident. Coffield spent the rest of his life in Missouri, and died in Mt. Vernon.

Selected bibliography
 Songs for the winds 1941 – 74 pages
 Ultimatum: (from the unforgettable) Untide Press – 1943 – 10 pages
 The horned moon 1944 – 29 pages
 A pewee's note: (poems: 1944) 1946 – 16 pages
 The modern problem 1946 – 14 pages
 Poetics (a summary) 1946 – 8 pages
 The horse of summer 1946 – 26 pages
 We think too much 1948 – 22 pages
 The citadel (of the mind) 1948 – 14 pages
 The waldport dilemma: (a second look) 1948 – 12 pages
 The Grundtvig Folk School in Oregon: a creative experiment in education Free schools – 1949 – 8 pages
 The night is where you fly: poems 1949 – 35 pages
 Selected poems (1943–1950) 1951 – 56 pages
 The silent waters 1950 – 53 pages
 Three songs Rounce & Coffin Club – 1951 – 12 pages
 Love and reason Reason – 1953 – 44 pages
 Silence and slow time (a snowscape): a poem for Christmas 1953 – 8 pages
 Northwest poems 1954 – 36 pages
 Criteria for poetry 1954 – 45 pages
 The old man who liked cats: (or Abra-Ki-Dabra-Ki-Boodle-Ki-Zam) 1954 – 14 pages
 Northwest prints 1954 – 10 pages
 Homage to King Lear: (a limerick sequence in five acts) 1954 – 34 pages
 The metaphysics of wrong numbers 1955 – 22 pages
 Rational power 1955 – 39 pages
 Christmas tide, 1954–1955 1955 – 4 pages
 New age anthology of poetry 1955 – 104 pages
 Tea leaves and transit lines: poems of prophecy and technic 1956 – 14 pages
 Sea climate and other poems 1956 – 14 pages
 The Grundtvig experiment Free schools – 1957 – 58 pages
 The Grundtvig poems 1957
 The bridge editorials 1957 – 36 pages
 Bridge anthology 1957 – 22 pages
 Twelve selected poems 1958 – 12 pages
 Bay area poems 1958 – 8 pages
 Glenn Stemmons Coffield's art coloring book 1958 – 24 pages
 Definition of God, and other poems 1960 – 12 pages
 Creative method: technical essays 1960 – 110 pages
 Thirty poems: The return and other poems 1963 – 37 pages
 Poetry workshop: (thirty exercises in poetics) 1963 – 30 pages
 The merry-go-round: (poems) 1969 – 32 pages
 Thinking: (poems) 1975 – 30 pages

References

1917 births
1981 deaths
20th-century American poets
American conscientious objectors
Members of the Civilian Public Service
People from Prescott, Arizona
Poets from Oregon